A total lunar eclipse will take place on Thursday, April 14, 2033.

Visibility

Related lunar eclipses

Lunar year series

Saros series

Tritos series

Half-Saros cycle
A lunar eclipse will be preceded and followed by solar eclipses by 9 years and 5.5 days (a half saros). This lunar eclipse is related to two total solar eclipses of Solar Saros 136.

See also
List of lunar eclipses and List of 21st-century lunar eclipses

Notes

External links

2033-04
2033-04
2033 in science